HMP Maghaberry was built on the site of RAF Maghaberry, a World War II airfield near Lisburn, Northern Ireland, which was used as a flying station by the Royal Air Force and also as a transit airfield for the United States Army Air Forces.  At the end of the war, the airfield was run down and bought back from the Air Ministry in 1957 by Edward Thomas Boyes who then farmed the old airfield with his sons until the Northern Ireland Office began work on the prison in 1976. 

Mourne House, which held all female prisoners, young offenders, and remands, was the first part of the new prison to be opened in March 1986. This followed the closure of the existing women's prison at HMP Armagh.  The male prison became fully operational on 2 November 1987. Following the closure of HMP Belfast on 31 March 1996, Maghaberry became the adult committal prison in Northern Ireland. Two new accommodation blocks were opened in 1999.

In 2003, the Steele report recommended options to make Maghaberry safe – including "a degree of separation" for Irish republican and Ulster loyalist inmates.

Maghaberry is currently a modern high-security prison, which houses adult male long-term sentenced and remand prisoners, in both separated and integrated conditions. The prison holds 970  prisoners in single and double cell accommodation.

In February 2016, a prison inspection report by the Northern Ireland Department of Justice condemned HMP Maghaberry as being unsafe and unstable and in operation without a correct insurance policy due to an ongoing land dispute over ownership citing suicides as well as clashes between inmates and prison staff. Her Majesty's Chief Inspector of Prisons in England and Wales Nick Hardwick described the prison as "one of the worst prisons I've ever seen and the most dangerous prison I've been to"

Notable Prisoners
 
Colin Howell
Michael Stone
Robert Black

References

External links
Northern Ireland Prison Service official website

1976 establishments in Northern Ireland
Prisons in Northern Ireland
Immigration detention centres and prisons in the United Kingdom